Livin', Lovin', Losin': Songs of the Louvin Brothers is a tribute album to the music of The Louvin Brothers, released in 2003.

The Louvin Brothers were an American country music duo composed of brothers Ira Louvin and Charlie Louvin. They helped popularize close harmony, a genre of country music. Their partnership ended in 1963 with Charlie continuing a long and successful career as a solo artist. Ira died in an automobile accident in 1965 and Charlie died in 2011 from pancreatic cancer.

History
Ira Louvin's daughter, Kathy Louvin, approached producer Carl Jackson with the idea of a Louvin Brothers tribute album. Jackson then enlisted the various artists who performed on the tracks. The
project was kept a secret from Charlie, the surviving Louvin Brother, until he accidentally heard about it and later became involved in the sessions.

Guest vocalists include Glen Campbell, Johnny Cash, James Taylor, Emmylou Harris, Alison Krauss, Vince Gill, Merle Haggard, Linda Ronstadt, Dolly Parton, and many others.

The recitation on "Keep Your Eyes on Jesus" was one of the last sessions Cash did before his death.

Reception

At the Grammy Awards of 2004, Livin', Lovin', Losin won the Grammy Award for Best Country Album and James Taylor and Alison Krauss won the Grammy Award for Best Country Collaboration with Vocals for their duet on "How's the World Treating You". In 2004, it won the International Bluegrass Music Association Award for the Recorded Event of the Year.

While applauding individual performances in his Allmusic review, Thom Jurek stated "[The Louvins] were successful during their era, the 1950s and early '60s, for a reason: they offered a view of life, love, loss, and the ever-present and eerie power of a God just beyond the pale with genuine wonder, fear, and pathos. Performed by superstars, legends, and others, most of the 16 tracks on Livin', Lovin', Losin' add nothing to the originals and, if anything, make somewhat generic what was special in its iconoclasm. The Louvins would not have a recording contract in this day and age, and any attempt by Carl Jackson to make them sound contemporary enough to be relevant in the stupid paranoid world of Nash Vegas country music circa 2003 is just ridiculous."

Conversely, Hank Kalet in his PopMatters review stated "The disc... [creates] a rarity of sorts: a fully fleshed out, perfectly executed tribute disc that captures the spirit of the recording artist it means to honor while also offering a collection of contemporary performances that are worth listening to on their own merit. The playing is flawless, the vocals inspired and the song selection a perfect glimpse into what made the Louvins one of the most influential acts in country history."

Track listing

Personnel
Harley Allen – vocals
Dierks Bentley – vocals
Bruce Bouton – pedal steel guitar
Glen Campbell – vocals
Johnny Cash – vocals
Terri Clark – vocals
Larry Cordle – vocals
J. T. Corenflos – guitar
Tony Creasman – drums
Rodney Crowell – vocals
Glen Duncan – fiddle
Ronnie Dunn – vocals
Vince Gill – vocals
Emory Gordy – bass
Kevin Grantt – bass
Mike Bub – bass
Merle Haggard – vocals
Emmylou Harris – vocals
David Harvey – mandolin
Pamela Brown Hayes – vocals
Rebecca Lynn Howard – vocals
Roy Huskey, Jr. – bass
Sonya Isaacs – vocals
Carl Jackson – vocals, guitar, banjo, mandolin, percussion
Mike Johnson – pedal steel guitar
The Jordanaires – vocals
Randy Kohrs – dobro
Alison Krauss – vocals
Kathy Louvin – vocals
Patty Loveless – vocals
Catherine Marx – piano
Del McCoury – vocals
Joe Nichols – vocals
Martin Parker – drums
Dolly Parton – vocals
Jon Randall – vocals
Matt Rollings – piano
Linda Ronstadt – vocals
Jerry Salley – vocals
Leslie Satcher – vocals
Adam Steffey – mandolin
Marty Stuart – vocals, mandolin, electronic drums
James Taylor – vocals
Pam Tillis – vocals
Steve Turner – drums
Jim Van Cleve – fiddle
Rhonda Vincent – vocalsProduction notes:'
Carl Jackson – producer, executive producer, vocal engineer, song notes
Kathy Louvin – executive producer
John "Babbacombe" Lee – engineer
Luke Wooten – engineer, vocal engineer
Jim Brady – vocal engineer
John Carter Cash – vocal engineer
Hank Williams – mastering
Tom Wilmeth – liner notes
Richard Pimsner – assistant
Beth Middleworth – art direction, design
Susan Levy – art direction

Chart performance

References

External links
Country Standard Time Retrieved January 22, 2010.

2003 albums
Country albums by American artists
Grammy Award for Best Country Album